Kazanskaya Khava is a rural locality (a selo) in Timiryazevskoye Rural Settlement, Novousmansky District, Voronezh Oblast, Russia. The population was 126 as of 2010. There are 3 streets.

Geography 
Kazanskaya Khava is located 27 km southeast of Novaya Usman (the district's administrative centre) by road. Timiryazevo is the nearest rural locality.

References 

Rural localities in Novousmansky District